The West Midlands Serious Crime Squad was a police unit in the English West Midlands which operated from 1974 to 1989. It was disbanded after an investigation into allegations of incompetence and abuse of power on the part of some of the squad's members. Some of this misconduct resulted in wrongful convictions, including the high-profile case of the Birmingham Six. The sister Regional Crime Squad based at Bilston was responsible for the investigation of the Bridgewater Four.

At least 40 convictions failed in the 1980s as a result of likely malpractice. Beginning with the case of Paul Dandy in 1987 and also Andrew Molloy from Marston Green Solihull was thought to be involved but was later acquitted of all charges, but new evidence later found by police revealed that he could have been a ringleader of gang operating in Birmingham but there wasn't enough evidence to convict him of any crime. Molloy, formerly of Bordesley Green, was found not guilty due to insufficient evidence, even though an amount of cash and weapons was seized from a lock-up rented by Molloy. Properties and vehicles were also seized as part of the investigation, including villas in Turkey and Spain along with nearly a million in cash, Ferraris and Porsches. Molloy was also known to have connections in Italy, Turkey and Spain. New forensic techniques were used to show when statements had been tampered with, usually adding incriminating phrases. As cases began to regularly collapse in the late 1980s, pressure mounted to investigate the squad. Clare Short raised the issue in Parliament in January 1989. The Birmingham Six's convictions were quashed in 1991. A series of other less high-profile convictions based on the squad's investigations were quashed on appeal, including the cases of George Glen Lewis, Keith Twitchell and, on 17 October 2014, Martin Foran, who had been wrongly convicted in 1978 for four counts of robbery. As of January 2017 a total of 60 appellants have had their convictions quashed. A total of over 100 cases either collapsed or were quashed on appeal.

In August 1989, the squad was shut down by the Chief Constable Geoffrey Dear, and the West Yorkshire Police was asked by the Police Complaints Authority to investigate the squad's activities from 1986 onwards. This meant that the Birmingham Six case was out of scope, as was that of the Bridgewater Four, although there was cross over of staff with the regional squad. The West Yorkshire Police reported in 1994, leading to disciplinary action against seven officers, but recommended against prosecutions for lack of evidence. Ten officers had avoided disciplinary action by leaving or retiring early, while around 100 received advice about police procedures. The Director of Public Prosecutions, Barbara Mills agreed with the report's view and did not attempt to prosecute any officers, and was widely criticised for this decision.

History

Formation of the Squad

The Serious Crime Squad (SCS) was formed in 1974 when the West Midlands Police was created by the Local Government Act 1972, merging Birmingham City Police with parts of a number of other forces that covered the new West Midlands area. The Squad's roots go back to 1952, when a Special Crime Squad was formed on an experimental basis. It successfully dealt with a number of metal thieves, a crime that had grown due to the growth of scrap metal collection from bomb sites in the post-War era. A second Regional Crime Squad was formed, to deal with crimes outside of Birmingham, with officers from neighbouring counties. In 1960, when the squad was known as the Birmingham Crime Squad, it detected over 1,060 crimes a year, and made 579 arrests. However, annual reports emphasise that the seriousness of the crimes rather than the quantity was the key factor in performance.

Early work
The squad dealt with the Birmingham pub bombings in 1974, bringing its work to national attention. It continued to deal with anti-terrorist investigations until 1979, when a separate squad was formed. This meant that the SCS had to reorient its own work primarily towards armed robberies. Also in 1979, the SCS moved to share offices with other West Midlands police units in Lloyd House.

In 1979–80, the SCS investigated a spate of armed robberies known as the 'Thursday Robberies' because they always took place on Thursdays. The gang was known as the Thursday Gang by the police. The SCS and the Robbery Squads worked together to catch the criminals responsible in Operation Cat. The 1991 Independent Report into the SCS states that "many Midlands solicitors we have spoken to believe [this operation] gave the green light to some officers … to indulge in serious malpractice". The arrests included Ronald, Donald and John Brown, whose convictions were later quashed.

In 1980 for the murder of a security guard, SCS arrested alleged criminals for armed robbery, John Irvine and Keith Twitchell, whose convictions were also later quashed.

1980s and declining performance
By 1982, the number of arrests by SCS had declined to less than 200. Despite a steady increase in reported crime and arrests made in the West Midlands, the squad generally reported fewer than 200 arrests a year during the 1980s. As a percentage of arrests made by West Midlands Police as a whole, their work was declining. Furthermore, many of the arrests were in practice for less than serious crimes. Burglary and theft accounted for around half of the arrests made. Explanations put forward included that criminals were becoming more sophisticated and were less "amenable" to making confessions. In 1988, the West Midlands Police explained that "Investigations are more protracted, and masks, disguises, false number plates and other means of evading capture are frequently used", techniques which are hardly unusual among hardened criminals committing serious crimes. Kaye concludes that police management knew that these excuses were thin, and that the squad was underperforming throughout the 1980s.

In 1984, the squad began to rely heavily on 'supergrass' evidence. These later proved unreliable, but did lead to a number of high-profile arrests. By the mid 1980s, colleagues "resented the 'support'" of the squad, thus avoided collaboration and referrals, further reducing the squad's ability to pursue serious crime.

The District Auditor strongly criticised the organisation's poor management in 1985 and 1989. The West Midlands police claimed that the SCS was being reorganised in 1988, with changes to recruitment practices, just before it was closed down.

The Police and Criminal Evidence Act 1984 should have changed many practices at the SCS, for instance by introducing the recording of interviews, and was noted as implemented in the 1986 annual report. Subsequent evidence however shows that its provisions were being widely ignored or evaded.

Rising concerns
Throughout the 1980s, there were concerns about the safety of the Birmingham Six convictions. Chris Mullin campaigned as an MP to see their convictions reviewed. Concerns about the Bridgewater Four, who had been investigated by the sister No 4 Regional Crime Squad, were investigated by Paul Foot.

A number of cases had been overturned in the 1980s and several members of the squad were seen to be unreliable witnesses. However, concerns were given particular credence due to a new forensic technique, using a machine known as an ESDA, or Electrostatic Detection Apparatus. The technique allowed forensic experts to trace impressions made on sheets of paper underneath the original, often showing when words or lines had been added to original statements. The first of the cases using this evidence was that of Paul Dandy, in 1987.

In January 1989 Clare Short, MP for Birmingham Ladywood, raised in Parliament the problems that Birmingham solicitors had encountered when trying to raise complaints about their clients' cases in relation to the squad. She detailed the apparently widespread practice the squad employed of doctoring statements by adding additional incriminating pages, which was leading to certain convictions being challenged. Nevertheless, the systemic issues at the West Midlands Serious Crime Squad were not being addressed, such as the apparent culture of making shortcuts and abusing procedure in order to perform well enough to qualify for promotion.

Disbandment and investigation
In August 1989, the squad was disbanded by Chief Constable Geoffrey Dear and a number of its senior officers were put on desk duties. In the same month, an investigation by West Yorkshire Police led by Assistant Chief Constable Donald Shaw was asked to examine allegations of misconduct at the squad. However, its remit was limited to complaints made after the start of 1986 "when complaints about the squad started to emerge". The question of whether the convictions in the Birmingham pub bombings case were safe was raised at the time, but was considered out of scope and unnecessary by the government. A number of the former SCS officers that had been placed on desk duties were returned to investigatory roles in 1990, after Dear left for another post and was replaced by Ronald Hadfield.

Inquiries and decision not to prosecute officers
The Civil Liberties Trust funded Birmingham University legal academic Tim Kaye to lead an independent inquiry, backed by an advisory panel including Clare Short and the Bishop of Birmingham Mark Santer. It reported in 1991, three years before the official inquiry, and presented evidence of systemic malpractice and patterns of fabrication of evidence and other procedural abuses by specific officers.

The official PCA report was published in 1994 and concluded that there had been "physical abuse of prisoners, fabrication of admissions, planting of evidence and mishandling of informants". However, just seven officers faced disciplinary action as a result of the report, for 28 disciplinary complaints. One officer faced a complaint about tampering with a statement, while the other six were suspected of irregularities relating to payments to informers. A further ten officers would have faced 20 complaints, but had left or retired. Another 102 officers were given informal advice about their failures to adhere to police procedures. The disciplinary procedures were conducted as an internal matter. However, the report recommended that no officers should face criminal charges.

The Director of Public Prosecutions, Barbara Mills, agreed that there was insufficient evidence to prosecute any officer at the squad, a decision for which she was widely criticised. Although no officers were prosecuted for their roles in corrupt investigations, former West Midlands Serious Crime Squad detective Laurence Henry Shaw was later convicted of attempted robbery in Solihull in 2001 and in 2010 for armed robbery in Lostwithiel, Cornwall.

Issues and malpractice
The SCS suffered from a number of issues, ranging from poor recruitment and management practices, to well-documented and repeated techniques of falsification. Poor management led to poor performance, which in turn exacerbated the pressure on officers to take shortcuts.

Management issues
The SCS had an 'elite' ethos, which may have induced a certain amount of arrogance when dealing with other investigators. Recruitment was usually through choice rather than open recruitment. The SCS was an all male, probably wholly white unit. Officers tended to serve for long periods rather than move regularly. Officers were allowed to work very long overtime hours. These factors may have together reinforced an insular culture. There are also recorded incidents of bullying of officers who reported malpractice.

The general West Midlands interview manual was criticised as being misleading and advising officers to assume guilt in a range of situations where this may not be true. The manual appeared to be a compendium of techniques and experience from officers rather than being based on independent psychological research and evidence. Reactions to interviews are made under stress and therefore need to be treated with caution, however the manual instead offered interpretations of various reactions as likely signs of guilt. The advice included contradictory interpretations of similar reactions, without codifying or recognising this. For instance, insisting on innocence and complaining about treatment was signalled in different parts of the manual as both indicating innocence and guilt. The Guardian concluded that West Midlands Police should "adopt the approach of Mersey scheme, with its emphasis on teaching the police to listen and frame questions. Research shows the biggest mistake in interrogation is the failure to listen to what is said".

There was a lax approach to the pairing of officers for interview. Officers who are less familiar with each other should be put together to reduce risks of poor or illegal practice. A number of regular pairings of interviewing officers seems to have led to collaboration in falsifying evidence.

It was West Midlands Police policy to transfer the vast majority of documents to microfiche after two years and destroy the originals. Often, the microfiche copies were unreadable. The practice also made it impossible to ascertain if statements had been interfered with through ESDA scanning and analysis.

Low level paperwork tasks were supervised by upper management, which was in general too involved in practical work including investigations, distracting from leadership, policy setting and supervision. Management focused on paper-based processes and was given little management training. Junior officers appeared to have a practical veto on new recruits.

Management practice was sufficiently poor for misleading statements to be made by the squad to external authorities. For instance, it told the Court of Appeal that officers had been disciplined after interference with witness statements, but that the changes did not include "incriminating admissions", which was wholly untrue. This led to the appeals of Horobin and Wilcox being turned down in 1988.

Confession evidence
The SCS often relied on confession evidence to the exclusion of other kinds of evidence, despite the fact that it is inherently unreliable. Sometimes this can simply be due to the presence of authority and the expectation to confess. It can be due to stress factors in interviews. Given a certain level of stress, some interviewees will confess simply to bring the experience to a stop. A third group may come to believe in their guilt over time. Thus false confessions are not the product of coercive techniques alone, but these factors can make confessions unsound.

Kaye noted five cases where a statement with a confession was presented back to other suspects, and self-incriminating reactions were noted, although not usually signed by the suspects. This evidence was then used in their convictions. For instance, Foran was noted as saying "What can I say? It's all there isn't it?" Boswell was recorded as saying "That fucking bastard, I'll kill him … we all agreed to make our own statements if caught and I can't make one against my own will, can I?"

Several confessions were said by police officers to have taken place in a squad car immediately after arrest. Sometimes, the suspects were taken to police stations some distance away from the arrest, in contravention of PACE regulations. Squad car interviews represent an opportunity to interview suspects without a solicitor, and make it relatively easy for officers to claim that incriminating statements were made, including through falsification of signed notes.

Signed confessions were shown from Dandy's case onwards to have been tampered with, due to forensic ESDA evidence. However, the original statements were generally destroyed, as noted above, making it impossible to make this analysis in most cases. Instead, courts later worked on the assumption that certain officers may have tampered with signed confessions on the basis of previous behaviour, making a conviction unsafe if it relied on this evidence.

Many confessions were recorded but not admitted to by defendants. The confessional statements were generally short and undetailed, even in the course of long interviews. Kaye notes in his examination that such confessions would be unusual as most of the suspects were criminals with several confessions, so likely to be very familiar with police procedure and the effect of such convictions, if they were insisting on their innocence.

Often the phraseology of the confessions was similar and hackneyed. Kaye records that many of them were variants on:
 'That's a bit heavy'
 'You're spot on'
 'That bastard's really put me in it'
 'You're putting a good case against me'

Kaye adds that the language of the statements were generally very similar, lacking differentiation in phraseology and colloquialisms, whether from Birmingham or the Black Country, nor reflecting the diverse backgrounds of the suspects, who may have been Asian, Afro-Caribbean, from different regions of Britain or Ireland. Only in the case of Afro-Caribbeans did he note any difference, where suspects would use the word 'man', despite using the same language patterns in every other respect.

Other evidence for interference with statements comes from the length of the statements. Where the content of the statements is claimed to have been added to, these frequently show implausibly fast note taking. Kaye calculates the transcription rate as being around 30 words a minute, rather than a more typical 20-23 a minute. In John O'Brien's case, DC Shaw was asked in court to read back his notes from an interview that was marked as having taken 15 minutes: he took 20 minutes to read them back. The case was dropped.

In order to make it hard for interviewees to be found by lawyers or relatives, police used haphazard interview locations, often to the annoyance of other police, especially as they would be implicitly tolerating the denial of suspects' rights to a solicitor. Arrests often took place very early in the morning, which is often standard police practice to ensure suspects are easily located, but would have made them disorientated at interview. Irregular, long and early hours would also have affected police performance.

Denying suspects access to a solicitor
Kaye's analysis of 1980s case evidence found that no confession evidence was produced when a solicitor was present. He also found that access to solicitors was delayed in every case, except those where no request was made. It appears therefore that the standard practice was to interview suspects with the aim of gaining a confession prior to allowing them a solicitor. Nevertheless, this did not stop the confession evidence from being used in successful trials.

In some cases, suspects were forced to sign custody records stating that they had not requested a solicitor. In one case, George Lewis, the custody sheet has a line marking the paper where his hand has clearly been knocked to prevent him striking out the statement saying he had agreed not to have a solicitor present. In another case, Charles Campbell, his solicitor Mr Shipley obtained the agreement of the police that no interview was to take place without his presence, but Campbell's confession was apparently obtained in an interview within fifteen minutes of his departure.

Supergrass evidence
Supergrass evidence was used to corroborate evidence from alleged confessions. It did not appear alongside other evidence, according to Kaye, so cases relied on a combination of confession and supergrass evidence.

Operation Cat, which included the conviction of Treadaway and Pendle, relied heavily on evidence from supergrass Keith Morgan. Morgan had admitted to 20 offences and was sentenced to five years in return for the evidence he presented. Morgan was not a reliable witness, however. He had also alleged that a Merseyside police officer helped him plan some robberies and demanded payment. These allegations were dismissed after an investigation. The fact of this allegation and its unreliability was not available to the defence of those he had accused.

Supergrass Albert McCabe implicated over 100 suspects from 1986, many of whom were prosecuted, but whose cases later collapsed. He was prosecuted himself for a small number of offences, admitting to nearly 70, and sentenced to six years in jail, the light sentence being part of the deal for giving evidence against others. He later wrote to the solicitors of those he had implicated to explain that his evidence was made under duress. Once convicted, he refused to make any further statements for the police.

Violence, intimidation and torture

Allegations were made in the early 1980s that SCS officers placed plastic bags over the heads of suspects, and covered their mouths, in order to partially suffocate them and extract a confession. Kaye notes that no allegation occurred after 1983. In Keith Twitchell's 1980 case, he underwent a polygraph test and a 'truth drug' test to try to establish that this had happened, but the evidence was deemed inadmissible by the court at the time.

In 1982–3, some of the accused in the Operation Cat convictions made the same allegation. In Derek Treadaway's case, a Home Office pathologist gave evidence that abrasions around his mouth and bruising on his shoulders and chest were consistent with his account of being held down on a chair and "plastic bagged" with his mouth covered.

Allegations of violence also declined, with many fewer after 1986, according to Kaye. Explanations for the decline in violence may include that it proved counter-productive, as evidence of physical abuse could be recorded and presented in court and that psychological pressure in obtaining confessions could be just as effective.

However, there were many serious allegations of violence towards suspects in the SCS's earlier history, the best known of which is that of the Birmingham Six. Derek Boswell made well-documented allegations in 1983, after he refused to make a statement. He claimed that an unknown officer entered his cell, beat him up and told him to make a statement. He was later visited by a doctor who recorded that he had blood stains on his T-shirt and trousers, blood clots in his nostrils and minor facial injuries, consistent with his account of being hit in the face. The officer was never identified, although Boswell gave a description of him at the time. One SCS officer was convicted in 1983 of beating up suspects on the evidence of a police cadet, who was subsequently ostracised and resigned.

As violence declined, complaints of threats increased, according to Kaye. Paul Fitzsimmons alleges that he was threatened while in prison with rearrest on release unless he supported the police's account of solicitors asking for bribes in another case, that of Ronnie Bolden. DS McManus is alleged to have asked Fitzsimmons to claim that Bolden's solicitors had offered him a bribe to give evidence to help Bolden.

Hassan Khan claimed that he was told during his journey back from arrest in North Wales, that he would be beaten up and treated in the same way as the Birmingham Six, and was going to meet the person who dealt with them.

Eileen McCabe, the sister of supergrass Albert, said she was told to sign a confession. Her children were brought to the police station, despite prior agreement that they were to stay with their grandmother, with the effect of making her extremely concerned about how they were being treated. She signed the confession, but it later came to light that she had difficulty reading so was unlikely to have understood its contents.

George Lewis alleged that he was threatened with a syringe, with police saying they would give him injections, which he feared, if he did not sign. A witness in the case of PC Salt's murder also alleges that she was intimidated and shouted at while being told to implicate the others involved, while the main suspects were threatened with the murder charges if they did not confess to his robbery.

Interference with evidence
In some cases, the SCS was accused of fabricating forensic evidence. Ronnie Bolden alleged that police rubbed his shoes and socks on a getaway car's carpet. In the case of Robert Burston and others, police were said to have taken bin liners with their fingerprints and placed them in a post office van. Keith Twitchell claimed his hairs were planted as evidence, although this was not used in court.

During the PCA inquiry, seven police notebooks were found to be missing, despite it being a requirement for these to be kept secure for seven years. Six arrest files out of 658 for the period 1986-August 1989 were missing. Kaye concludes that files going missing was "not uncommon" at the SCS. In the case of Gall, this included witness statements from the assault victim which described their assailant as very different in appearance from Gall. This evidence did re-appear, late in the court case, but Gall was still convicted.

Michael Brommell, convicted of shotgun offences, complained about a fabricated confession. However, the interview notes had gone missing, making it impossible to identify the officers who had taken them. Nevertheless, two officers had viewed the file containing these notes the day before they went missing. The officers were suspended when the SCS was disbanded, but reinstated after it was found that there was no evidence that they had removed the notes.

Some cases relied on timing evidence which may have been altered. For instance, Michael Foran was said to have been arrested at 3.05pm, just after an accomplice had arranged to meet him at Hurst Street car park. However, Foran was logged as being in a cell by 3.12pm, a mere seven minutes later. Foran claimed to have been arrested at 2.05pm; an entry on his arrest sheet was crossed out, however the original document was destroyed so could not be examined.

Timing evidence was also important in the Birmingham Six case, where a forensic scientist Dr Frank Skuse stated he examined the suspects and found them in good health at a time that was later than the time at which they claimed had been beaten up. However, he had not taken notes, and a local chemist had been contacted by him at a time compatible with the defence's account.

Failed prosecutions

Paul Dandy
Dandy's case was the first where ESDA evidence showed that tampering with statements had taken place at the SCS, and opened up the possibility of others who had complained but not been believed to have their cases re-examined.

In 1987, Dandy spent 18 months in prison, awaiting trial for armed robbery. His defence presented forensic evidence from an ESDA examination showing that his statement may have been tampered with, adding a one line confession from Dandy. The case collapsed.

In 1993, Dandy was awarded £70,000 compensation for his ten-month detention on remand. The police officers concerned were disciplined internally, and a report given to the Crown Prosecution Service to consider if there was further action to take.

Peter Gibbs, Mark Samuels and Tony Francis
Gibbs, Samuels and Francis were arrested, accused of being involved with the death of PC Tony Salt. Salt had been on duty with PC Mark Berry on 16 April 1989 in Small Heath, supposedly watching an illegal nightclub from a flat. According to Chris Mullin, recounting the events in Parliament, Salt most likely died after a bout of heavy drinking while on duty led to his collapse. Mullin states that Berry made four statements, which gradually increased the number and involvement of one to three black men in the incident, one of whom was said to have dreadlocks.

At a press conference the day after the death, Assistant Chief Constable Meffen "asserted that PC Salt had broken cover to check a suspect car and was set upon by a person or persons with martial arts skills, dragged into the alley and beaten to death" although these details did not appear in any of the statements made by PC Mark Berry.

Gibbs, Samuels and Francis were arrested and interviewed. None had dreadlocks. Mullin stated:

"Mr. Gibbs … describes how, once he had agreed to admit the thefts, he was carefully rehearsed in what he was to say once the recorder was switched on: 'They were saying you can either do it peacefully or we can do it rough. I've been beaten up before in police stations and its not very nice. I wasn't prepared to go through all that again.' Eventually, he agreed to admit to stealing PC Salt's wallet and a martial arts weapon called a cubiton that Salt was thought to be carrying."

According to Mullin, Samuels confessed to theft after being threatened with being charged with murder and Francis was told that his family would be set up on drugs charges if he did not confess to theft, while another witness was told to say she had witnessed Francis hitting Salt. After securing their confessions to theft, all three men were charged with murder.

However, the case against the three quickly unravelled. A taxi driver had witnessed Salt and Berry's drinking bout. Salt's wife said that she had found the cubiton that two of the suspects had confessed to stealing, and stated that Salt had taken no more than £5 that night, rather than the £30 said to have been stolen. The pathologist showed that although Salt had suffered a blow to the neck, he could not have then walked 120 feet from the party to the place where he died. Mullin related that pathologist stated that "most likely explanation for his death was that, in his drunken state, Mr. Salt had fallen and hit his head on the bucket of a JCB digger parked nearby".

The charges were dropped, although this was around a year after the original events, despite the strength of the evidence that they were innocent.

Salt was included on the roll of honour of officer's who fell in the line of duty by the Police Federation. His name was included on the memorial in the West Midlands Police headquarters on Colmore Row as well as the national police memorial in London.

Overturned convictions
Around 40 convictions failed in the 1980s, and a further 60 convictions have since been overturned. This is a summary of those cases where there has been news reporting or the judgment has been published. A near complete list can be found below.

Birmingham Six

The Birmingham Six, Hugh Callaghan, Patrick Joseph Hill, Gerard Hunter, Richard McIlkenny, William Power and John Walker, were each sentenced to life imprisonment in 1975 following their false convictions for the 1974 Birmingham pub bombings. Their convictions were declared unjust and unsatisfactory and quashed by the Court of Appeal on 14 March 1991. The six men were later awarded compensation ranging from £840,000 to £1.2 million.

Derek Treadaway, Michael Dunne, Ronald, Donald and John Brown
Derek Treadaway, Michael Dunne, Ronald, Donald and John Brown were arrested in Operation Cat and accused of being members of the so-called Thursday Gang, named after a series of post office robberies which were committed on Thursdays.

Treadaway was convicted in 1983 of three post office robberies committed in 1979 in Erdington and elsewhere. His conviction was overturned in 1996. He was a victim of "bagging", that is use of a plastic bag to suffocate interviewee's to extract a confession.

Treadaway alleged at a civil trial for damages "that his confession was the false product of police impropriety in handcuffing him, placing a series of plastic bags over his head, so as to suffocate him, and forcing him in this condition to sign the written confession which had already been prepared for signature by police officers. There was evidence in the criminal trial that he had, by reason of this conduct, sustained petechial haemorrhages on his breast bone, about which a doctor gave evidence for the defence. He also complained in the course of the criminal trial that he had been deliberately denied access to a solicitor."

Other evidence that was relied on at trial came from 'supergrass' witnesses, whose close involvement with corrupt officers made their testimony dubious. Several of the officers involved failed to turn up to the appeal hearings.

Ronald, Donald and John Brown, also convicted for the robberies, had their convictions overturned later, in two separate appeals.

George Glen Lewis
Lewis was arrested in January 1987 and subsequently convicted for two armed robberies and a burglary. His case was examined by the Yorkshire Police during their investigation.

He told the Court of Appeal that be was "head-butted, punched and threatened with a syringe as he was questioned". He was forced to sign a confession and was racially abused. ESDA evidence of the impressions left by his signatures showed that it was likely that he had signed blank sheets of paper that were then used to write a statement in reverse order to that in which it was signed.

His conviction relied on the evidence of Detective Constable John Perkins and Detective Constable Peter Reynolds, who stated that Lewis confessed while they were driving to the police station after his arrest. Perkins allegedly refused to allow Lewis a solicitor, threatened him, punched him and demanded that he sign blank interview sheets.

He served five and half years in prison and was awarded £200,000 in compensation when his conviction was quashed.

Keith Twitchell, John Lyon McCloy and Patrick Irvine
Twitchell, McCloy and Irvine were arrested and convicted of involvement in a robbery in 1980. Twitchell claimed at trial that police had "handcuffed him to the back legs of a chair he was sitting on and placed a plastic bag over his head, the material pressed to his nose and mouth."

His solicitor, Mr Solley stated at the trial that the “bag was removed from his head. The procedure was repeated a number of times, until finally his resolve was totally dissolved and he agreed to sign the statement put in front of him”. A policeman was alleged to have threatened that “the bastard signs or he goes feet first.”

Twitchell complained about being 'bagged' at the time. He was denied access to a solicitor until he had signed a statement. All three had their convictions quashed.

Tarlochan Singh Gill and three others
Gill was convicted in 1984 of the murder of Wati Suri during a burglary. She was beaten and strangled. Three other men allegedly involved were found guilty but their convictions were quashed in 1985. Gill's conviction however was upheld on the basis of a confession he was said to have made. He had spent ten years in jail when his conviction was quashed on the basis that his confession was extracted by Detective Sergeant James, whose evidence had been found to be unreliable in three other cases. As Gill's conviction relied on that evidence, it was found to be unsafe and was quashed.

John Joseph Cummiskey and Roy Meads
Cummiskey and Meads were convicted of armed robbery of £185,000 from a postal van. They separately had their convictions quashed. Roy Meads' conviction was quashed in January 1996.

Cummiskey was jailed in 1985 and served eight years of a 15-year sentence. He asked for permission to appeal in 1987 but was refused. His second request in 1999 followed the review of other cases by the Criminal Cases Review Commission. His appeal was granted in 2003.

David Murphy and Patrick O'Toole
Murphy and O'Toole's were convicted in 1978 of armed robbery at a British Leyland plant at Ward End. Murphy received eight years and O'Toole seven.

At appeal, the court noted that "Murphy says he was abused and intimidated by the police and he made no confessions. O'Toole says he was beaten up by police officers, especially DS Matthews, when he refused to make a statement admitting his part in the robbery."

Their convictions were quashed in 2006, as the conviction "critically depended on the evidence of police officers, notably Hornby and Matthews, whose characters have subsequently been gravely tainted, especially that of Hornby".

Martin Foran
Foran was convicted of four counts of robbery in 1978. He was arrested and convicted again in 1984 for a pub robbery. Both convictions were quashed, in 2013 and 2014. In 2013, reviewing the conviction for his 1984 offence, the courts found that police had ignored evidence that the 'Martin' sought was a 'kid' and that tampering with statements had been widespread in the squad at the time and in particular evidence handled by DI Matthews was unreliable. The defence had also been denied access to evidence that could have helped them.

Overturned convictions at the Regional Crime Squad
The No 4 Regional Crime Squad was a sister squad to the SCS, operating over a wider area. Many of its officers were recruited to the SCS including several who were later involved in misconduct.

Bridgewater Four

The Bridgewater Four were Patrick Molloy, James Robinson and cousins Michael Hickey and Vincent Hickey. On 21 February 1997, the last in a number of appeals saw the men's convictions overturned, after the Court of Appeal ruled that the trial had been unfair, as certain areas of evidence had been fabricated by police in order to persuade the now-deceased Molloy to make a confession. However, the Appeal Judges noted that in the light of Vincent Hickey's confessions to being present at the farm where Bridgewater was shot dead "we consider that there remains evidence on which a reasonable jury properly directed could convict."

The officers involved were later employed at the West Midlands Serious Crime Squad.

See also
 List of failed and overturned convictions involving the West Midlands Serious Crime Squad
 List of miscarriage of justice cases in the United Kingdom

Notes

References

News articles

Judgments

Parliament

Reports

Books

Journal articles

Video and television

Other

Police units of the United Kingdom
Overturned convictions in England
Crime in the West Midlands (county)